Karrar may refer to:

 Karrar (name), a list of people with the given name
 Karrar (tank), an Iranian main battle tank
 HESA Karrar, an Iranian jet-powered target drone
 Karrar, Kurdamir, a village in Azerbaijan
 Karrer (crater), a lunar crater

See also
 Karra (disambiguation)